Along Came Auntie is a 1926 American silent film featuring Glenn Tryon and Oliver Hardy.

Plot

Mrs Remington Chow is concealing her second marriage from her aunt in order to receive a large inheritance. She is in financial difficulties and is thinking of taking in lodgers again much to the dismay of the maid. A man comes to the door with a bulldog and demands she pays her debt. As the maid goes out the man slips in.

Mr Chow comes back from holiday as her first husband is entertaining her with a violin. The debt collector is hiding in the piano. As he emerges he gets tangled in the fight between husbands. Aunt Alvira arrives. Mrs Chow says she is still married to Vincent. Mrs Chow says they are friends playing a rough game "Duck the Knob". Mrs Chow tells her husband to pretend to be the lodger.

Auntie likes Vincent and sits on his knee. She spies Mrs Chow kissing who she thinks is the lodger and gets Vincent to interject. Mr Chow gets his gun.

History and preservation status
This two-reel film was released on July 25, 1926. The film survives complete at the Library of Congress.

Cast
 Glenn Tryon as Mr. Chow, the 2nd husband
 Vivien Oakland as Mrs. Remington Chow, the wife
 Oliver Hardy as Mr. Vincent Belcher, the first husband
 Tyler Brooke as The Under-Sheriff
 Martha Sleeper as Marie, the maid
 Lucy Beaumont as Aunt Alvira

See also
 Oliver Hardy filmography

References

External links

1926 films
American silent short films
Silent American comedy films
American black-and-white films
1926 short films
Films directed by Fred Guiol
Films directed by Richard Wallace
American comedy short films
1926 comedy films
1920s American films
1920s English-language films